Paralida balanaspis is a moth in the family Gelechiidae. It was described by Edward Meyrick in 1930. It is found in Thailand and Vietnam.

The wingspan is about 15 mm. The forewings are ochreous white with a small black mark on the base of the costa and a minute dot in the disc obliquely beyond this. There is also an elongate semi-fusiform black blotch along the costa from one-third to three-fourths, preceded and followed on the costa by very small black marks, near beneath it in the disc beyond the middle a narrow-elongate black spot. From the costal mark beyond this is a pale brownish streak beneath the costa to the apex, with two small black costal spots above this. A small black wedge-shaped spot is found on the termen beneath the apex and there is some slight greyish shading towards the termen. The hindwings are grey, subhyaline (almost glass like) towards the base and with the veins are suffused with darker grey.

References

Chelariini
Moths described in 1930